Christiana Guinle is a gender-fluid Brazilian actress and producer who graduated from the Royal Shakespeare Company in England.

Theater - actress 
 Homer’s Odissey – won Mambembe best actress award
 O Ateneu, by Raul Pompéia - won Mambembe best new actress award
 Medea, by Eurípedes
 LuLu, by Frank Wedekind
 The Blind, by Ghelderode – Shell best actress award nominee

Theater – actress and producer 
 Hell is Other People, based on Jean-Paul Sartre’s Huis-Clos – Molière best actress award nominee
 O Anjo Negro (The Dark Angel), by Nelson Rodrigues – won A.P.C.A. best actress award
 The Lady from the Sea, by Ibsen – won Shell best actress award
 God, by Woody Allen
 Raised in Captivity, by Nicky Silver

Cinema 
 A Espera (The Wait), by Luiz Fernando Carvalho – the film won Gramado best film award
 Mil e Uma (One Thousand and One), by Suzana Morais about Marcel Duchamp’s work
 Metalguru, by Flavio Colker – won Berlin’s alternative festival best actress award

Television 
 Chiquinha Gonzaga, by Manoel Carlos – television miniseries about the life of Chiquinha Gonzaga (Brazilian composer, pianist, and conductor), broadcast by Rede Globo Network
 A Casa das Sete Mulheres (The House of Seven Women), by Maria Adelaide Amaral - television miniseries broadcast by Rede Globo Network .
 Um Só Coração (Just One Heart), by Maria Adelaide Amaral - television miniseries broadcast by Rede Globo Network
 JK, by Maria Adelaide Amaral - television miniseries about the life of Juscelino Kubitschek (President of Brazil from 1956 to 1961),  broadcast by Rede Globo Network
 Lado a Lado - Rede Globo Network (2012-2013)

References

Brazilian actresses
Living people
Year of birth missing (living people)
Brazilian non-binary actors
21st-century LGBT people